Sarsai is a village of Visavadar Taluka Junagadh district, Gujarat State, India. Its Postal Index Number is 362120. It is located near Satadhar. A popular place named "sant rohidas ashsram" is in Sarsai.

Sarsai village has population of 1,084 families and 5,162 individuals, of which 2,661 are males while 2,501 are females, as per Population Census 2011. As per constitution of India and gram panchayati Raaj Act, Sarsai village is administrated by Head of Village (Sarpanch) who is elected representative of village.

Nearby villages include Moti Monpari, Jambudi, Piyava Gir, Chaparda,  Moniya, and Juni-Chavand. Sarsai is surrounded  by Mendarda Taluka  to the west, Bhesan Taluka to the north, Bagasara Taluka to the east, and Junagadh Taluka to the west. Junagadh, Amreli, Keshod, Veraval, and Kodinar are the nearby cities to Sarsai.

Dhrafad dam is situated at 0.5 km from Sarsai.

Nearest tourist places  
Sasan Gir
Girnar
Somnath
Veraval
Satadhar Temple (Shri AAPAGIGA, Shree Padapir)
Parab Dham (Sat Devidas Amar Devidas Temple/Ashram)

References

Villages in Junagadh district